Notes from an Apocalypse: A Personal Journey to the End of the World and Back is a 2020 non-fiction book by Irish writer Mark O'Connell.

Synopsis
Notes from an Apocalypse is an investigative book about the anxieties of a potential ecological and social collapse and the movements of survivalism that have followed. Mark O'Connell describes his experiences at the Chernobyl Exclusion Zone, survival bunkers in South Dakota, an apocalyptic retreat in New Zealand, and with the environmentalist group Dark Mountain Project in the Scottish Highlands. He details his communications with doomsday preppers, aspiring space colonists and right-wing conspiracists.

Reception
At the review aggregator website Book Marks, which assigns individual ratings to book reviews from mainstream literary critics, the book received a cumulative "Positive" rating based on 20 reviews: 8 "Rave" reviews, 10 "Positive" reviews, 1 "Mixed" review, and 1 "Pan" review.

Publishers Weekly and Kirkus Reviews praised the "wry" humour of O'Connell's writing style.

James McConnachie of The Times gave the book a rave review, praising O'Connell's humour, sincerity and "bitingly clever" analysis.

Lauren Oyler of The Guardian gave the book a negative review, criticizing its "high-flown language" and narrative style.

The book was also reviewed in The New York Times, The Wall Street Journal, NPR, The Irish Times, Wired and The Observer.

References

2020 non-fiction books
Granta Books books
Irish non-fiction books
Books about survival skills
Apocalyptic literature